The Evangelical Lutheran Church of Schaumburg-Lippe is a Lutheran member church (Landeskirche) of the Evangelical Church in Germany. It covers the former principality of Schaumburg-Lippe and seated in Bückeburg.

The church has 48,171 members and is one of the smallest regional Protestant churches in Germany. The church is one of the members of the United Evangelical Lutheran Church of Germany (VELKD) and of the Confederation of Protestant Churches in Lower Saxony. The ordination of women and blessing of same-sex marriages has been allowed.

Bishops 
 1949–1966: Wilhelm Henke
 1966–1979: Johann Gottfried Maltusch
 1979–1991: Joachim Heubach
 1991–2001: Heinrich Herrmanns
 2001–2009: Jürgen Johannesdotter
 2009–: Karl-Hinrich Manzke

References

External links
Official Homepage - Evangelical Lutheran Church Of Schaumburg-Lippe (Ger.)

Schaumburg-Lippe
Schaumburg-Lippe
Schaumburg-Lippe
Schaumburg-Lippe
Schaumburg-Lippe
Schaumburg-Lippe